Rocket: Robot on Wheels is a platform game developed by Sucker Punch Productions and published by Ubi Soft for the Nintendo 64. It marked the first game developed by Sucker Punch, and their only game that it released on a Nintendo console, as Sucker Punch would be associated more closely with Sony Interactive Entertainment in its later years. In it, the player controls Rocket, the titular robot. Rocket: Robot on Wheels was  the first game on a home platform to use a realistic physics engine to drive the gameplay. The player can solve puzzles dealing with mass, inertia, friction, and other physical properties.

Gameplay 
The game has six differently themed worlds, all connected to a main "Whoopie World" hub area. Each world, along with the hub, contains 12 tickets and 200 tokens to collect. During gameplay, tickets are earned by completing different objectives in each world, such as assisting non-player characters, completing minigames, or collecting all the tokens in a world. A certain total number of tickets must be collected to open new worlds, while tokens can be exchanged with Tinker the maintenance robot for new abilities. Eight booster packs can also be collected, each of which will increase Rocket's maximum health. Each world has at least one vehicle that is used for solving puzzles and getting tickets; for example, the first world has a hot-dog-shaped car that the player can drive. Other tickets require finding seven machine parts in each world to reactivate a machine and gain access to new areas. After collecting enough tickets in the six worlds, the player can access the final stage, "Jojo World", to confront the antagonist, Jojo. The game's soundtrack features jazz and psychedelic tracks primarily dominated by organ and piano.

Plot 
Rocket is a robot created by Dr. Gavin, the architect and owner of Whoopie World, a futuristic theme park. On the night before opening day, Gavin goes to a party, leaving Rocket in charge of the park and its two animal mascots: Whoopie the walrus and his sidekick Jojo the raccoon. Jojo, who is envious of Whoopie being the star attraction, secretly plots to ruin opening day and rebrand the park as Jojo World. As soon as Gavin leaves, Jojo escapes his cage, clobbers Rocket senseless with a mallet, and grabs all of the park's tickets and tokens. Jojo abducts Whoopie and teleports into the park, causing the attractions to go haywire. Rocket gives chase and begins exploring the many areas of the park, working to find the stolen tickets and tokens so he can catch Jojo and rescue Whoopie before Gavin returns.

After finding many of the missing tickets and tokens, Rocket confronts and defeats Jojo, freeing Whoopie just as Dr. Gavin returns. Gavin commends Rocket for his hard work before leaving again to repair Jojo's damage to the park before it opens. After finding all the tickets and tokens, Rocket is honored by Gavin for his achievements by renaming the park RocketLand, much to Whoopie's dismay.

Development 
After Sucker Punch's founders left Microsoft and formed the studio, they decided to develop a game for the Nintendo 64. The team went to Nintendo to pitch the game but were rejected. Without development kits or tool libraries, they developed a prototype of the game using a PC. The developers pitched the prototype to Nintendo and received development kits, but Nintendo refused to publish the game.

They spent around a year creating the first level in the game, entirely self-funded and began pitching to multiple developers. Ironically they pitched the game to Sony Interactive Entertainment, who was impressed with it, but they stipulated the game still be released on N64 and later ported to the PlayStation. Nervous about both the concept not being mascot-centric and a potential game being on their biggest competitor's system, Sony declined. They also pitched to Electronic Arts and were on the cusp of breaking a deal, but it would require the game be cancelled and Sucker Punch start anew on a PlayStation 2 title. The team got cold feet about putting a game on the cutting board, so they continued to pitch it.

Eventually the team went to E3 1999 to present the game themselves, which produced positive coverage in gaming magazines such as Next Generation, catching the attention of Ubi Soft, who finally agreed to publish the game. In hindsight, the developers lament pitching the game when mostly complete and massively underestimating the process of getting a publisher.

The game had initially been developed under the title Sprocket until three months before its release, when it was changed due to a trademark conflict with Game Sprockets.

Reception 

The game received "favorable" reviews according to the review aggregation website GameRankings. Doug Trueman of NextGen called it "an attractive, almost anti-violent 3D puzzler with graphics intended for kids, but with some puzzles whose level of challenge is more appropriate for adults." Lou Gubrious of GamePro said in one review that the game "works so well precisely because it is so different from the typical platform game. The realism of the gameplay, set in the surreal world of a cartoony theme park, makes this a game well worth any gamer's time." However, Boba Fatt said in another review that the game's interface "is far more challenging than its puzzles or obstacles, making Rocket just one long, unrewarding exercise in tedium."

The game was listed as the "18th Best Nintendo 64 Game of All Time" in Nintendo Powers 20th anniversary issue.

Notes

References

External links 
 
 

1999 video games
3D platform games
Nintendo 64 games
Nintendo 64-only games
Single-player video games
Ubisoft games
Video games developed in the United States
Video games about raccoons	
Video games about robots
Video games set in amusement parks
Video games scored by Ashif Hakik